Robert Felton (27 December 1909 – 4 October 1982) was an English first-class cricketer active 1935–48 who played for Middlesex. He was born in Streatham; died in Ealing.

References

1909 births
1982 deaths
English cricketers
Middlesex cricketers
Minor Counties cricketers
H. D. G. Leveson Gower's XI cricketers